FISD is an acronym that may refer to:

 Federal Investigative Services Division, a part of the United States Office of Personnel Management, does background checks for military and civilian positions requiring security clearance
 Independent School Districts in Texas - F
 Financial Information Services Division of Software and Information Industry Association
 Federal Institute for Sustainable Development